Angel Tompkins is an American actress. She appeared in several films and television shows, and is a Golden Globe nominee.

Career
Angel Tompkins was a model in the Chicago area before being discovered by Woody Allen, who sent her to Universal Pictures. She was signed and became part of the last Universal contract players. She started her television and film-acting career in the late 1960s. She made her major film debut as the seductive blonde who came between husband and wife, Elliott Gould and Brenda Vaccaro, in the comedy I Love My Wife (1970), and was nominated for a Golden Globe award. Tompkins was featured in the pictorial "Angel" in the February 1972 edition of Playboy; subsequently, the magazine used her in three more editions, all presumably related to that film promotion.

She appeared in Prime Cut (1972) with Lee Marvin, Gene Hackman, and Sissy Spacek and Little Cigars (1973) as a gangster's moll who teams up with a gang of little people. She also appeared with Anthony Quinn in The Don Is Dead (1973), with former child star Jay North in The Teacher (1974), and with Bo Svenson in the action sequel Walking Tall Part 2 (1975). Her later films included The One Man Jury (1978), The Bees (1978), Alligator (1980), The Naked Cage (1986), Dangerously Close (1986), and Murphy's Law (1986), opposite Charles Bronson.

In 1987, Tompkins appeared in the comedy film Amazon Women on the Moon and with Ann-Margret in the film A Tiger's Tale, and made her last film appearances in Relentless (1989) and Crack House (1989). She also works in the commercial voice-over field.

On television, Tompkins appeared in the pilot for Search (1972). The pilot was originally titled Probe, but the title was changed to Search due to a PBS program already having that title.  She also appeared in several of the early episodes of Search. She appeared in many guest spots on shows such as  The Wild Wild West (1968), Mannix (1967), Dragnet (1969 episode "Forgery: (DR-33)"), Bonanza (1970), Police Woman (1970), Kojak (1977), The Eddie Capra Mysteries (1978), Three's Company (1978), Knight Rider (1983), and Simon & Simon (1981). Tompkins additionally appeared in the episode "Gallery of Fear" on the Canadian sci-fi program The Starlost.

In 1991, Tompkins was elected the national recording secretary of the Screen Actors Guild (SAG). She ran unsuccessfully for president of the guild in 1995. In 1996, she received the most votes for the SAG Hollywood Board of Directors. She ran for president again in 1999, changing her name to Angeltompkins so  her name would appear first on the ballot, and came in third. In 2000, she proposed that members of SAG's partner union, American Federation of Television and Radio Artists, vote to decertify the union and recertify as part of SAG. She came in fourth in the 2001 SAG election, her fifth attempt.

Personal life
She has been married to television and film writer/comedy rewriter, venture capitalist, Ted Lang since 1985. They have two children: Troy and Channing, Their homes are in Los Angeles, San Francisco and Fallbrook, California.

Filmography

Film

Television

Awards and nominations

References

External links

 
 

20th-century American actresses
Actresses from California
Actresses from the San Francisco Bay Area
American film actresses
American television actresses
Models from Illinois
People from Albany, California
Living people
21st-century American actresses
21st-century American women
1942 births